Tony Maddox is a British journalist.   He was executive vice president and managing director of CNN International from 2003 until May 2019.

He previously worked at the BBC for 13 years as a reporter, news producer and news editor.

In 2015 he was honored by the U.S. State Department as a Trafficking in Persons Report Hero for starting the CNN Freedom Project.

He left CNN in May 2019 for retirement after 21 years with the company by accepting a voluntary buyout option.

References

Living people
British journalists
CNN people
Year of birth missing (living people)
Place of birth missing (living people)